Ilia Kaikatsishvili (born 19 February 1993) is a Georgian rugby union player. He plays for Georgia and for RC Massy in Pro D2.

References

1993 births
Living people
Expatriate rugby union players from Georgia (country)
Expatriate rugby union players in France
Rugby union players from Georgia (country)
Expatriate sportspeople from Georgia (country) in France
Rugby union props